Carl Anthony Fisher, SSJ (November 24, 1945 – September 2, 1993) was an African-American Catholic prelate who served as an Auxiliary Bishop of Los Angeles from 1987 until his death in 1993. He was the first (and as of 2022, the only) Black Catholic bishop on the West Coast.

He was a member of the Society of St. Joseph of the Sacred Heart, a religious community that serves African Americans. He was the third Josephite to be made a bishop, and as of 2022, the latest.

Biography 
Born in Pascagoula, Mississippi, Fisher attended Epiphany Apostolic College as well as St. Joseph's Seminary, and was ordained to the priesthood for the Society of St Joseph of the Sacred Heart on June 2, 1973. He then served in Baltimore for some time, including at Historic St Francis Xavier Church beginning in 1982.

On December 23, 1986, he was appointed titular bishop of Tlos and auxiliary bishop of the Archdiocese of Los Angeles and was consecrated on February 23, 1987. He was the first African-American Catholic bishop west of Texas, and as of 2022 none have been named since. 

He died of colon cancer while in office, at the age of 47 in 1993.

Sex abuse allegations 
In Augustin 2019, the Archdiocese of Baltimore announced that Fisher was the subject of multiple abuse allegations, all of which were received after his death.

Notes

1945 births
1993 deaths
People from Pascagoula, Mississippi
Catholics from Mississippi
African-American Roman Catholic bishops
Josephite bishops
Bishops appointed by Pope John Paul II
20th-century American Roman Catholic titular bishops
Epiphany Apostolic College
St. Joseph's Seminary (Washington, DC)
African-American Catholic consecrated religious